The Indian Institute of Information Technology Surat (IIIT Surat) is one of the Indian Institutes of Information Technology established by MHRD  in PPP mode located in Surat, Gujarat.The Institute  has been conferred  as Institute of National Importance (INI) on Feb 5 , 2020.  IIIT Surat is operating from its temporary premises at Sardar Vallabhbhai National Institute of Technology (SVNIT). The institute is mentored by SVNIT for an initial period of 2–3 years till the construction of the new campus. The IIIT Surat is built on a public-private partnership (PPP) model, jointly funded by State Government and industry partners Gujarat Narmada Valley Fertilisers & Chemicals, Gujarat Gas and Gujarat Informatics.

History 
To address the challenges faced by the Indian IT Industry & growth of the domestic IT Market, the Ministry of Human Resource Development (MHRD), Government of India has established twenty Indian Institutes of Information Technology (IIIT), on not-for-profit Public Private Partnership basis. As a part of this, IIIT-Surat was planned and started with initial mentoring by SVNIT, Surat till the new campus of IIIT is ready in Surat. A memorandum of understanding and a memorandum of association have been signed between the President of India, the Governor of the State of Gujarat and Industry partners namely; Gujarat Narmada Fertilizer Corporation (GNFC), Gujarat Informatics Limited (GIL) and Gujarat Gas Limited (GAL). After series of meetings at MHRD, Directorate of Technical Education (Gujarat State) and SVNIT, Surat planned various academic activities. State Government has requested Collector of Surat to allocate 50 acres of land in Surat and is in progress. B. Tech. courses in Electronics & Communication Engineering and Computer Science & Engineering have begun in SVNIT campus from July, 2017.

Campus 
The new academic facility was developed in the land allotted by Gujarat Government at Kamrej in Surat district. The additional facilities will be developed in the campus in near future. The facility consists necessary infrastructure for the Institute.

Academics

Academic programmes
The institute currently offers only B.Tech courses in Computer Science Engineering and Electronics & Communication Engineering. The academic activities of IIIT-Surat are in time-synchronization with those of SVNIT.

The curriculum of both the branches is designed by keeping in mind the latest standards of the industry. Latest topics in the field of Information Technology like Machine Learning, Natural Language Processing, Artificial Intelligence etc. are also prescribed in the syllabus of both the branches. Advanced courses and a total of seven electives in later years enable students to specialize in signal processing, robotics, embedded systems, and other streams. The syllabus is also updated periodically in order to cater to the needs of the industry. The core subjects of the branches are introduced from the first year itself.

Admissions 
The admission to the above-mentioned courses is through JEE MAINS Entrance Exam. The Counselling & Seat Allotment  is conducted by Joint Seat Allocation Authority (JoSAA).

References

Surat
Universities and colleges in Gujarat
Education in Surat
2017 establishments in Gujarat
Educational institutions established in 2017